Gordon Murray Shepherd (21 July 1933 – 9 June 2022) was an American neuroscientist who carried out basic experimental and computational  research on how neurons are organized into microcircuits to carry out the functional operations of the nervous system.  Using the olfactory system as a model that spans multiple levels of space, time and disciplines, his studies have ranged from molecular to behavioral, recognized by an annual lecture at Yale University on "integrative neuroscience". At the time of his death, he was  professor of neuroscience emeritus at the Yale School of Medicine.  He graduated from Iowa State University with a BA, Harvard Medical School with a MD, and the University of Oxford with a DPhill.

Early work
 
His graduate studies in 1963 of the electrophysiology of the olfactory bulb produced one of the first diagrams of a brain microcircuit.  Building on this work he collaborated with Wilfrid Rall, just then founding the new field of computational neuroscience, at NIH to construct the first computational models of brain neurons: the mitral and granule cell.  This predicted previously unknown dendrodendritic interactions between the mitral and granule cells, subsequently confirmed by electronmicroscopy.  These interactions were hypothesized to mediate lateral inhibition in the processing of the sensory input as well as generate oscillatory activity involved in odor processing.  The model suggested active properties in the dendrites, which was subsequently confirmed, through which the model accounts for non-topographic interactions throughout the olfactory bulb. This paper was included in the "Essays on APS Classic Papers" series:

"But probably the tour de force of Rall’s works (and perhaps of computational neuroscience in general) is the 1968 paper of
Rall and Shepherd in the Journal of Neurophysiology. Unlike most other Rall studies that provided a conceptual
framework, this one is different because it really dived into the guts of a specific system, the olfactory bulb."

The next problem addressed was how odors are represented in the brain.  A collaboration in 1975, using new methods of brain imaging, revealed for the first time that odors are encoded by different spatial activity patterns in the olfactory glomeruli of the olfactory bulb. This showed that the neural basis of smell in vertebrates involves odor representation by glomerular activity patterns ("odor images") which are then processed by the widely distributed olfactory bulb microcircuits.

Among the odor-induced patterns was a focus on a "modified glomerular complex", the first of a subsystem of "necklace glomeruli" in the main olfactory bulb that receives specific input from olfactory receptors that respond to odor stimuli through a cyclic GMP second messenger system.  
 
Shepherd's lab has used the olfactory bulb as a general model for the integrative actions of neuronal dendrites.  This showed that dendrites can contain multiple computational units; backpropagating action potentials in dendrites carry out specific functional operations; and dendritic spines can function as semi-independent input-output units.  The lab also provided a basic circuit for olfactory cortex. 
New concepts to replace the classical "neuron doctrine" were hypothesized, and the term "microcircuit" was introduced for characterizing specific patterns of synaptic interactions in the nervous system.

Recent and Current Studies

Shepherd's odor imaging studies were extended by use of high-field functional MRI (7 and 9 Tesla), work started with his longtime colleague Charles Greer and members of the Yale Imaging Center.  The lab has introduced viral tracing methods to reveal widely dispersed clusters of granule cells which are hypothesized to be necessary for processing the distributed glomeruli activated by odor stimuli. These experimental data were used to build novel 3D computational models of the distributed mitral and granule cell circuits, to obtain insight into the nature of the processing that underlies smell perception.

What are the sensory "primitives" that are processed as the basis of smell perception?  This fundamental problem was attacked by modeling the molecular interactions between odor molecules and the new discovered olfactory receptors.  "Determinants" were identified on the odor molecules that activate specific sites on the receptors to encode the identity of the odor molecule.

A new appreciation of the human sense of smell suggested a new focus on retronasal smell, which activates an extensive "flavor system" in the human brain; this led in 2015 to a new field of "neurogastronomy", based on his book of that name which has among its goals enhancing understanding of the factors contributing to clinical conditions and global health.  A new society and annual meeting have been formed by Shepherd, Dan Han, Frédéric Morin, Charles Spence, Tim McClintock, Bob Perry, Jehangir Mehta, Kelsey Rahenkamp, Siddharth Kapoor, Ouita Michel, and Bret Smith, called the International Society of Neurogastronomy (ISN).  ISN is sponsored by the National Institute on Deafness and Other Communication Disorders/National Institutes of Health.  The same principles have been applied to wine tasting in Neuroenology  
These principles are illustrated by animation for Neurogastronomy  and Neuroenology.

The olfactory bulb projects to the olfactory cortex which projects to the neocortex where smell perception occurs.  Early studies with Lewis Haberly of olfactory cortex led to a basic circuit of pyramidal cells with feedback and lateral excitation and inhibition as the basis for higher olfactory processing.  Current studies with paleontologist Timothy Rowe suggest that during evolution this basic three layer microcircuit combined with reptilian dorsal cortex to form the neocortex.

His lab was among the original group that founded the field of neuroinformatics, with the first funding of the Human Brain Project in 1993.  The home site is "SenseLab", which contains a suite of 9 databases supporting research on olfactory receptors, odor maps, neuronal and dendritic properties, and neuronal and microcircuit models.  SenseLab was founded by Shepherd, Perry Miller, founder of the Yale Center for Medical Informatics, and Michael Hines, founder of the widely used modeling program NEURON.

Partial bibliography 
 Shepherd, G.M. (1974).  The Synaptic Organization of the Brain. New York: Oxford University Press. 
 Shepherd, G.M. (1983).  Neurobiology. New York: Oxford University Press. 
 Shepherd, G.M. (1991).  Foundations of the Neuron Doctrine.  New York: Oxford University Press. 
 Segev, I., Rinzel, J. and Shepherd, G.M. (Eds.). (1995). The Theoretical Foundation of Dendritic Function:  Selected Papers of Wilfrid Rall.  Cambridge, Mass.: MIT Press
 Shepherd, G.M. (2010). Creating Modern Neuroscience: The Revolutionary 1950s. New York: Oxford University Press
 Shepherd, G.M. and Grillner, S. (Eds.) (2010). Handbook of Brain Microcircuits. New York: Oxford University Press  	
Shepherd, G.M. (2011). Neurogastronomy: How the Brain Creates Flavor and Why It Matters. New York: Columbia University Press  	
Shepherd, G.M. (2016). Neuroenology: How the Brain Creates the Taste of Wine. New York: Columbia University Press

Honors
Honorary degree, University of Copenhagen, 1999
Honorary degree, University of Pavia, 2006
ISN Award of Excellence, the International Society of Neurogastronomy, 2015

References

1933 births
2022 deaths
American neuroscientists
Yale School of Medicine faculty
20th-century American scientists
21st-century American scientists
Place of birth missing
Iowa State University alumni
Harvard Medical School alumni
Alumni of the University of Oxford